Léon Bouveret (27 September 1850 – 1929) was a French internist born in Saint-Julien-sur-Reyssouze, a community in the department of Ain. 

After receiving his doctorate in Paris in 1878, he became director of a clinic in Lyon that was run by professor Raphaël Lépine (1840–1919).

As a young physician, Bouveret played an important role in the fight against cholera in Ardèche. In 1889, he provided an early description of paroxysmal tachycardia (Bouveret's disease). The term "" is also named after him, being defined as a gastric outlet obstruction caused by a large gallstone migrating into the duodenal bulb through a biliogastric or bilioduodenal fistula.

He is remembered for his written efforts, in particular, "" (Treatise on diseases of the stomach) and "" (a publication on neurasthenia). With Raymond Tripier (1838-1916), he was the co-author of "" (1886), a book that recommended cold baths for the treatment of typhoid fever.

References 
 Léon Bouveret @ Who Named It

1850 births
1929 deaths
People from Ain
French internists
Academic staff of the University of Lyon